Samir Allioui (born 1983) is a Dutch politician and activist. From August 2009 to April 2010, Allioui served as the Co-President of Pirate Parties International, firstly with Pat Mächler and later with Jerry Weyer. He was later elected a Co-Chair of Pirate Parties International, serving from March 2011 to April 2012. Allioui was also the lijsttrekker for the Pirate Party of the Netherlands during the 2010 Dutch general election.

Early life and education

Allioui was born in Amsterdam to a Moroccan father. His mother was 16 when she gave birth to him, and Allioui ended up spending time in several different orphanages. However, he spent most of his childhood with foster parents in Zoetermeer. Allioui also lived in the Hague for a few years, which was when his 16-year-old sister was killed in the house when he was not home. Five years after her death, he tracked down the culprit using his computer skills, and the culprit was prosecuted by the police. Allioui was complimented by the judge for his efforts.

Allioui became very interested in computing, particularly coding and writing script at school. After he finished school, he spent a short time in the Dutch Army, and a year as a programmer at a marketing consultancy, before studying Business Information Technology at Windesheim University of Applied Sciences.

Political career

Pirate Parties International

Allioui, alongside Pat Mächler, became joint Co-Presidents in charge of the 'Coreteam' of Pirate Parties International (PPI) in August 2009, following the resignation of sole coordinator Andrew Norton on 2 August. Allioui served in this role until the 2010 founding conference of the PPI on 18 April 2010. Mächler stepped down on 1 March 2010, shortly before the conference, which meant that between the Mächler stepping down and the conference, his role was filled by Jerry Weyer. During the conference, Weyer and Grégory Engels were elected the first Co-Chairs of the PPI.

Allioui was re-elected as a Co-Chair of Pirate Parties International during their 2011 conference in Friedrichshafen, Germany. He was elected alongside Marcel Kolaja and served from 13 March 2011 until the next conference which ended on 15 April 2012.

Allioui was described by Andrew Norton as "a constant and outspoken critic of the PPI Board".

Pirate Party of the Netherlands

Allioui is a co-founder of the Pirate Party of the Netherlands, and also served as their informal leader, notably during the 2010 Dutch general election, where he was the lijsttrekker for the Pirate Party. Allioui was the lijstduwer for the Pirate Party in the 2012 Dutch general election.

References 

1983 births
Living people
Dutch political party founders
Pirate Party (Netherlands) politicians